Amanul Haque is a Bangladeshi dancer. He was awarded Ekushey Padak award in 2016 by the Government of Bangladesh in the category of arts (dance).

Career
Haq took dance lessons of Bharatanatyam, Kuchipudi and Manipuri dance from Ghanashyam Das Lakshman Bijoy and his wife Nileema.
 In 1959, he started his career as a dancer in Ghanashyam Anjariya in Karachi, Pakistan. He is the convenor of Bangladesh Nrityashilpi Sangstha (BNSS).

In 1963, Haque joined the Industrial Development Bank of Pakistan while continuing his practice of music and dance.

In 1964, Haque became the first person from East Pakistan to appear as a dancer on Karachi Television. He became the dance director of his debut film titled Neela Parbat. In 1966, he joined Barin Mazumder's music college. Later, he joined a cultural organization Kranti.

Works
 Jolche Agun Khete Khamare (1967)
 Mukhi Matara
 Kaberi Teere
 Kushumer Shopno
 Bikhubdho 7 June
 Battle of Bangladesh
 Ei Desh Ei Mati Amar

Awards
 Ekushey Padak (2016)
 Shilpakala Padak (2013)
 Bulbul Chowdhury Memorial Award (2013)
 BACHSHASH Award for music composition of Dahan and Annyajibon
 Shanta Marium University Award
 Nrittyadhara Award
 Benuka Sangeet Academy Award

References

Living people
Bangladeshi male dancers
Recipients of the Ekushey Padak
Bangladeshi choreographers
Year of birth missing (living people)